

Early life and family 

Douglas Charles McIntosh (23 March 1916 – 25 December 1976) was New Zealand's fifth Chief Censor of Films from 1960 until his death on Christmas Day 1976. In this role, he applied the Cinematograph Films Act 1928 to films; initially this was the 1961 version of the Act, then just before his death it was replaced by the 1976 Act. He was born on 23 March 1916 in Karori, a suburb of Wellington. He married Mable Agnes Mildred Western (Picton) and they had one son and two daughters.
He died 25 December 1976 in Karori.

A keen follower of Cricket and Rugby Union. He coached a local Karori rugby team. Regularly buying boots for players who could not afford them.

Censorship 

The Nevile Lodge cartoon depicted very clearly the balancing act conducted by the role of Chief Censor at the time. Bill Rowling had been caught cutting embarrassing bits from a think tank report. The cartoon below highlights the influence of Patricia Bartlett using moral suasion and public opinion to influence the censorship decisions. The Censor's office at the time, had four censor's aged in their 30's 40's 50's and 60's specifically to provide a balanced judgement, at a time of growing liberal public attitudes.  

The 1967 film Ulysses (1967 film) was passed by the Chief Censor Doug McIntosh and was viewed by the R18 audience's uncut. Though cinema's had to segregate the public based on gender. Because of the sexual content and language. Both Wellington based newspapers The Dominion and The Post viewed this as preferable to censorship.

References

External links
 Cinematograph Films Act 1961
 The Cinematograph Films Act 1976

1916 births
1976 deaths
People from Wellington City
Chief Censors of New Zealand